Lavmeet Katariya, known simply as Lavmeet, is a member of India men's national volleyball team and wears the Number 10 jersey. Lavmeet plays as a middle blocker/middle hitter.

He has led the Rajasthan men's team in the Indian national volleyball meet, and the Indian men's team in the Asian Men's U20 Volleyball Championship.

He has won gold medal in 12th south Asian games winning the best blocker award. He won silver medal in 2014 Asia Cup.

References

Living people
Indian men's volleyball players
1993 births
Volleyball players from Rajasthan
Volleyball players at the 2014 Asian Games
Place of birth missing (living people)
Asian Games competitors for India